Efficiency  is the extent to which time or effort is well used for the intended task or purpose.

Efficiency may also refer to:

 Efficiency (aerodynamics), the amount of lift divided by the aerodynamic drag
 Efficiency (apartment), a one-room apartment
 Efficiency (basketball), a statistical benchmark to compare the overall value of players
 Efficiency (economics), a situation in which nothing can be improved without something else being hurt
 Efficiency (fair division), any changes made to assist one person would harm another
 Efficiency (finance), non-mean-variance portfolio analysis, a way of showing that a portfolio is not efficient
 Efficiency (mechanical)
 Efficiency (network science), a measure of how efficiently a network exchanges information
 Efficiency (statistics), a measure of quality of an estimator, experiment, or test
 Energy efficiency (physics), the ratio of power consumed to useful power output

See also 
 Efficient (horse) (foaled 2003), a New Zealand Thoroughbred racehorse
 Effectiveness
 Inefficiency (disambiguation)
 Energy efficiency (disambiguation)